Yeni Daşkənd is a village and municipality in the Barda Rayon of Azerbaijan.  It has a population of 2,220.

Notable people
 Samir Eldar oglu Safarov is an Azerbaijani military officer, lieutenant colonel serving in the Azerbaijani Armed Forces.

References

Populated places in Barda District